The East Karbi Anglong district is a new district formed out of the existing Karbi Anglong District of Assam in 2016. Diphu is the headquarter of the newly formed district. The district is a part of Karbi Anglong Autonomous Council, Diphu and it is administered according to the Sixth Scheduled of the Indian Constitution.

Languages
Karbi language is widely spoken in the district. English, Assamese and Hindi are the other languages that are spoken in the district. The district is inhibited by many tribes,  Karbi being the majority, along with Tiwa, Lalung, Garo, Bodo and other tribes and communities.

Transport 
The district headquarter is connected by road. Karbi Anglong Autonomous Council Transport buses ply at regular interval from the district headquarter to important places like Guwahati, Hamren, Lanka and Hojai. Also one Meghalaya Transport run regularly to and fro from Diphu to Jowai. The nearest railway station is at Hojai.

See also
 West Karbi Anglong district

References

External links

2016 establishments in Assam
Autonomous regions of India
Districts of Assam
States and territories established in 2016